The 1980 Summer Olympics boycott was one part of a number of actions initiated by the United States to protest against the Soviet invasion of Afghanistan. The Soviet Union, which hosted the 1980 Summer Olympics in Moscow, and its allies later boycotted the 1984 Summer Olympics in Los Angeles.

Background
The Western governments first considered the idea of boycotting the Moscow 1980 Summer Olympics in response to the situation in Afghanistan at the 20 December 1979 meeting of NATO representatives. The idea was not completely new to the world: in the mid-1970s, proposals for an Olympic boycott circulated widely among human rights activists and groups as a sanction for Soviet violations of human rights. At that time, very few member governments expressed interest in the proposal. However, this idea gained popularity in early January 1980 when Soviet nuclear scientist and dissident Andrei Sakharov called for a boycott. On 14 January 1980, the Carter Administration joined Sakharov's appeal and set a deadline by which the Soviet Union must pull out of Afghanistan or face the consequences, including an international boycott of the games. On 26 January 1980, Canadian Prime Minister Joe Clark announced that Canada, like the US, would boycott the Olympic Games if Soviet forces did not leave Afghanistan by 20 February 1980. Carter also proposed moving the Olympics to Greece on a permanent basis to eliminate the issue of politicisation of the Games' hosting, but the International Olympic Committee (IOC) rejected this idea.

When the deadline passed a month later without any change to the situation in Central Asia, Carter pushed U.S. allies to pull their Olympic teams from the upcoming games.

In late January, the Soviet regime prepared to face down this "hostile campaign". As Soviet Central Committee documents show, in addition to its own propaganda efforts, it was relying on the IOC and its 89 members to behave as in the past (e.g. after the Soviet invasions of Hungary in 1956 and Czechoslovakia in 1968), and not give in to pressure from national governments. It noted that the government and the National Olympic Committee of France had already stated a willingness to participate.

After its 24 April meeting, the head of the United States Olympic Committee (USOC) Robert Kane told the IOC that the USOC would be willing to send a team to Moscow if there were a "spectacular change in the international situation" in the coming weeks.

In an attempt to save the Games, Lord Killanin, then president of the IOC, arranged to meet and discuss the boycott with Jimmy Carter and Soviet General Secretary Leonid Brezhnev, before the new 24 May deadline. Killanin insisted that the Games should continue as scheduled, while President Carter reaffirmed the US position to boycott the Games unless the Soviet Union withdrew from Afghanistan.

The IOC protested that the pressures by the US and other supporting countries for the boycott were an inappropriate means to achieve a political end, and the victims of this action would be the athletes. West German Chancellor Helmut Schmidt said that the American attitude that the allies "should simply do as they are told" was unacceptable, although West Germany did join the boycott.

Responses by country and continent
Boxer Muhammad Ali traveled to Tanzania, Nigeria, and Senegal to unsuccessfully convince their leaders to join the boycott. He did, however successfully convince the Kenyan government to do so.

Many countries ultimately joined the US in a full boycott of the Games. These included Japan and West Germany, where Chancellor Schmidt was able to convince the West German Olympic Committee to support the boycott. China, the Philippines, Chile, Argentina and Norway also boycotted the Games entirely. Some of these countries competed at the alternative "Liberty Bell Classic" or Olympic Boycott Games held in Philadelphia that same year. Israel also joined the boycott to protest Soviet military agression, but also because of Soviet anti-semitic and anti-Israel policies.

The governments of the United Kingdom, France, and Australia supported the boycott, but left any final decision over the participation of their country's athletes to their respective NOCs and the decision of their individual athletes. The United Kingdom and France sent a much smaller athletic delegation than would have originally been possible. The British associations that governed equestrian sports, hockey, shooting and yachting completely boycotted the 1980 Summer Olympics.

Spain, Italy, Sweden, Iceland and Finland were other principal nations representing western Europe at the Games. Of these, Spain and Italy participated under a neutral flag with the Olympic anthem playing in any ceremony. Italian athletes serving in its military corps could not attend the Games, however, because of the national government's official support of the boycott. Many events were affected by the loss of participants, and some US-born athletes who were citizens of other countries, such as Italy and Australia, did compete in Moscow.

A firm enemy of the United States under Ayatollah Khomeini's new theocracy, Iran also boycotted the Moscow Games after Khomeini joined the condemnation by the United Nations and the Islamic Conference of the invasion of Afghanistan. Independently of the United States, the Islamic Conference urged a boycott of Moscow after the invasion; the Ayatollah meanwhile accused Moscow of arming the Baluchis against his regime.

Athletes and sportspeople competing without national flags or anthems
Lord Killanin permitted NOC-qualified athletes to compete at the Games without their national flags or anthems (which allowed NOCs to send athletes in a non-national context), but this did not allow other individuals lacking NOC sanction to participate in the Games, as this was perceived by the IOC as a potential weakening of their authority. Four competitors (including one athlete) from New Zealand competed independently and marched under their NOC flag because the government officially supported the boycott. The athletes of 16 countries did not fly their national flags. Instead, Olympic flags were raised, and the Olympic Anthem replaced their national anthems at the medal ceremonies. There was one awards ceremony where three Olympic flags were raised, that being the men's individual pursuit in cycling.

Other modifications were made to the Games' activities, such as when the boycott prevented Montreal Mayor Jean Drapeau from attending the Moscow Games. Sandra Henderson and Stéphane Préfontaine, the final torchbearers at the previous games, were sent in his stead to participate in the Antwerp Ceremony at the opening ceremony, and at the closing ceremony, the Los Angeles city flag (rather than the United States flag) was raised to symbolize the next host of the Olympic Games in a break from tradition that was initiated by the host nation. The Antwerp flag was received by an IOC member from the United States instead of the mayor of Los Angeles, Tom Bradley; there was no handover to Los Angeles ceremony at the closing.

Non-participating countries

Sixty-five countries that were invited to the 1980 Olympics, plus Qatar, did not participate for various reasons, including support for the boycott and economic reasons. (Qatar's 1980 IOC recognition came too late for it to be invited.) Taiwan refused to participate as a result of the 1979 Nagoya Resolution, in which the People's Republic of China agreed to participate in IOC activities if Taiwan was referred to as "Chinese Taipei". However, China boycotted the 1980 Moscow Games as well.

 
 
 
 
 
 
 
  Belize
 
 
 
 
 
 
 
 
 
 
 
 
 
 
 
 
 
 
 
 
 
 
 
 
 
 
 
 
 
 
 
 
 
 
 
 
 
 
 
 
 
 
 
 
 
 
 
 
 
 
 
 
 
 
 
 
 
  Zaire

Altered participation
The sixteen nations that follow participated in the Games under some adjustment to full conventional participation in the Games activities.

Nations that did not participate in the Opening Ceremony
Seven countries participated in the Games without taking part in the Opening Ceremony:

National teams represented at the Opening Ceremony by Chef de Mission
Two nations sent one representative each (Chef de Mission) who entered the Olympic stadium during the Opening Ceremony under the Olympic flag; for each country this was a token gesture, as their governments allowed individual national sports federations and in some cases individual athletes to take part in the Games if they chose to do so. Ireland also competed under the Olympic flag, rather than its own.
  – Richard Palmer
  – Ken Ryan

Nations under the Olympic Flag by their own athletes
At least five national teams participated at the Games under the Olympic flag rather than their respective National or NOC flags, as doing the latter would have denoted that their participation was officially sanctioned by their respective nations.

Nations that competed under their respective NOC flag
Some nations competed under the flag of their National Olympic Committee.

Alternative events
Events were staged separately in several sports, including the Liberty Bell Classic for track and field and the USGF International Invitational for gymnastics. The U.S.–Cuban 12-bout card at the Charlotte Coliseum (on Independence Boulevard, now Bojangles' Coliseum) on February 10, 1980, became the only meeting between Cuban and American boxers and was an important event in boxing; called "one of the prime matches of the year," by U.S. boxing Coach Tom Johnson.

Soviet monetary reimbursements
In April 1981, a Federal District court in Manhattan approved the settlement of two suits involving more than 9,000 Americans who were seeking refunds of payments they had made for trips to the Olympics that were canceled in wake of the boycott.

When the boycott was first announced, tour deposits of over 10 million dollars were refunded by the Russian Travel Bureau, the only agency authorized to book American tours during the Olympics. Although the Soviet Union kept about 7.2 million collected by the Bureau, they had agreed to set aside 1.8 million as credits to be paid back over five years.

Under the April 1981 settlement the remunerations were increased: Americans who had canceled their trips before the 1 March 1980 were reimbursed a total 85 percent of their costs, while those who had canceled after that date were reimbursed 63 percent.

See also

 1984 Summer Olympics boycott
 1986 Asian Games
 List of Olympic Games boycotts

References

Further reading
 Eaton, Joseph. "Reconsidering the 1980 Moscow Olympic boycott: American sports diplomacy in East Asian perspective." Diplomatic History 40.5 (2016): 845-864.

Boycott of the Summer Olympics, 1980
Boycotts of Russia
Carter administration controversies
Congressional Gold Medal recipients
International sports boycotts
Summer Olympics boycott
Summer Olympics Boycott, 1980
Summer Olympics boycott
Olympic Games controversies
China–Soviet Union relations
Soviet–Afghan War
Soviet Union–United States relations